Raorchestes jayarami, also known as Jayaram's bush frog, is a species of frog from the subfamily rhacophoridae found in Valparai in the Western Ghats of Tamil Nadu in India. Individuals of this species from the genus Raorchestes have morphs that range from plain green to variations with splotches and dots of darker greens and in some cases yellow. Anuran's from the genus Raorchestes, show direct-development while allows them to be independent from a waterbody for the development of tadpoles.

References

External links
 

jayarami
Frogs of India
Endemic fauna of the Western Ghats
Amphibians described in 2009